The following highways are numbered 757:

Canada
Alberta Highway 757

Costa Rica
 National Route 757

United States